
Gmina Kadzidło is a rural gmina (administrative district) in Ostrołęka County, Masovian Voivodeship, in east-central Poland.

Villages
Gmina Kadzidło contains the following villages and settlements: Brzozowa, Brzozówka, Chudek, Czarnia, Dylewo, Dylewo Nowe, Gleba, Golanka, Grale, Jazgarka, Jeglijowiec, Kadzidło, Karaska, Kierzek, Klimki, Krobia, Kuczyńskie, Piasecznia, Podgórze, Rososz, Siarcza Łąka, Sól, Strzałki, Tatary, Todzia and Wach.

Neighbouring gminas
Gmina Kadzidło is bordered by the gminas of Baranowo, Lelis, Łyse, Myszyniec and Zbójna.

References

Polish official population figures 2006

Kadzidlo
Ostrołęka County